A. assamensis may refer to:

Antheraea assamensis, the Assam silk moth, a moth species
Amolops assamensis, a frog species